The commanding general of United States Army Training and Doctrine Command (CG TRADOC) is the head of United States Army Training and Doctrine Command (TRADOC). They head approximately 27,000 soldiers and 11,000 civilians who work at 21 installations across the continental United States. As commander, one of their main duties is to study a number of ideas and initiatives as outlined in previous TRADOC Campaign Plans and create a plan of action for the future. Implementations made can affect TRADOC's 32 schools as well as other training throughout the United States Army. The current commanding general is General Gary M. Brito.

List of TRADOC Commanding Generals

See also
United States Army Training and Doctrine Command

References

United States Army Training and Doctrine Command
Commanding Generals, TRADOC